

Champions

Major League Baseball
World Series: Pittsburgh Pirates over Baltimore Orioles (4–3); Willie Stargell, MVP

American League Championship Series MVP: None.
National League Championship Series MVP: Willie Stargell
All-Star Game, July 17 at the Kingdome: National League, 7–6; Dave Parker, MVP

Other champions
College World Series: Cal State-Fullerton
Cuban National Series: Sancti Spíritus
Japan Series: Hiroshima Toyo Carp over Kintetsu Buffaloes (4–3)
Big League World Series: West Hempstead, New York
Little League World Series: Pu-Tzu Town, Hsien, Taiwan
Senior League World Series: Tung–Feng LL Taichung, Taiwan
Pan American Games: Cuba over Dominican Republic
Winter Leagues
1979 Caribbean Series: Navegantes del Magallanes
Dominican Republic League: Águilas Cibaeñas
Mexican Pacific League: Mayos de Navojoa
Puerto Rican League: Criollos de Caguas
Venezuelan League: Navegantes del Magallanes

Awards and honors
Baseball Hall of Fame
Warren Giles
Willie Mays
Hack Wilson
Most Valuable Player
Don Baylor, California Angels, OF (AL)
Willie Stargell, Pittsburgh Pirates, 1B and Keith Hernandez, St. Louis Cardinals, 1B (NL)
Cy Young Award
Mike Flanagan, Baltimore Orioles (AL)
Bruce Sutter, Chicago Cubs (NL)
Rookie of the Year
John Castino, Minnesota Twins, 3B and Alfredo Griffin, Toronto Blue Jays, SS (AL)
Rick Sutcliffe, Los Angeles Dodgers, P (NL)
Woman Executive of the Year (major or minor league): Doris Krucker, Midwest League
Gold Glove Award
Cecil Cooper (1B) Milwaukee Brewers (AL) 
Frank White (2B) Kansas City Royals (AL) 
Buddy Bell (3B) Texas Rangers (AL) 
Rick Burleson (SS) Boston Red Sox (AL) 
Dwight Evans (OF) Boston Red Sox (AL) 
Fred Lynn (OF) Boston Red Sox (AL) 
Sixto Lezcano (OF) Milwaukee Brewers (AL)
Jim Sundberg (C) Texas Rangers (AL) 
Jim Palmer (P) Baltimore Orioles (AL)

MLB statistical leaders

Major league baseball final standings

Events

January
January 15 – The Seattle Mariners sign Tom Paciorek as a free agent.
January 23 – Willie Mays receives 409 of 432 votes in the Baseball Writers' Association of America election to earn enshrinement in the Hall of Fame.
 The Toronto Blue Jays sell the contract of Designated Hitter Sam Ewing to the Nippon Ham Fighters of the Japanese Pacific League.
January 26 – The Los Angeles Dodgers sign free agent Alan Wiggins.

February
February 3 – The Minnesota Twins trade Rod Carew to the California Angels for Ken Landreaux, Dave Engle, Paul Hartzell and Brad Havens. His first season with the Angels, he helps his new team reach the post season for the first time, batting over .300 for the next five seasons, and being selected for the next six American League All-Star teams.
February 15 – The Los Angeles Dodgers trade catcher Brad Gulden to the New York Yankees for outfielder Gary Thomasson. Gulden would later that season start the August 6th game against the Baltimore Orioles, which was the Yankees first game after the funeral for Thurman Munson, who'd died days earlier in a plane crash.

March
March 7 – The Special Veterans Committee selects Warren Giles and Hack Wilson for the Hall of Fame.
March 10 – The St. Louis Cardinals signed outfielder Bernie Carbo as a free agent. 
March 26 – The New York Mets released infielder Bobby Valentine.
March 28 – Pitcher Tom House is released by the Seattle Mariners.

April
April 7 – In the earliest no-hitter in major league history, the Houston Astros' Ken Forsch shuts down the Atlanta Braves 6–0. His brother, St. Louis Cardinals pitcher Bob Forsch, hurled a no-hitter the previous season against the Philadelphia Phillies — making them the first big league brothers to each toss a no-hitter.
April 15 – The New York Mets sign 16 year old infielder Jose Oquendo as a free agent. 
April 17 – The Oakland Athletics beat the Seattle Mariners 6-5 BUT only 653 fans at Oakland Alameda Coliseum we're there. Some reports also say that only 250 people we're there for that night game.
April 19 – New York Yankees' closer Rich Gossage breaks his right thumb in a clubhouse fight with teammate Cliff Johnson.  Gossage would miss almost two months, while 1978 American League Cy Young Award winner Ron Guidry voluntarily replaced him in the bullpen for a short time.

May
May 9 – With the score tied 4-4 in the ninth inning, and Jimmy Sexton on first base with no outs, the Houston Astros' Terry Puhl lays down a sacrifice bunt. The Cardinals attempt to get the lead runner on the play, however, second base umpire Dave Pallone calls Sexton safe, claiming that Garry Templeton never touched the bag. Cardinals manager Ken Boyer, First baseman Keith Hernandez and catcher Ted Simmons are ejected from the game. Players on the Cardinals bench begin throwing bats and helmets onto the field in protest. As a result, Pallone orders the entire Cardinals bench into the clubhouse, allowing players only to come onto the field as needed. The Cardinals would get out of the inning without a run scoring; however, they would lose in the sixteenth inning.
May 11 – The New York Yankees purchase the contract of Jim Kaat from the Philadelphia Phillies. 
May 17 – Dave Kingman of the Chicago Cubs hits three home runs and Mike Schmidt of the Philadelphia Phillies hits two, the second of which proves to be the game winner in the tenth inning, as the Phillies beat the Cubs 23–22 at Wrigley Field. Bill Buckner had a grand slam and seven RBIs for Chicago. The game included a then Major League record 11 home runs and 50 hits.
May 21 – Batting ninth for the Toronto Blue Jays, Danny Ainge makes his major debut. Ainge gets three  hits in four at bats and drives in a run as Toronto defeated the Cleveland Indians 8-1. While Ainge played just one season of major league baseball, he'd go on to greater fame as a member of the NBA's Boston Celtics. 
May 25 – Starter Ross Baumgarten and reliever Randy Scarbery pitched the first combined one-hitter in Chicago White Sox history, defeating Nolan Ryan and the California Angels, 6–1, at Comiskey Park.
May 28 – Texas Rangers first baseman Mike Jorgensen is hit in the head by a pitch from Boston Red Sox pitcher Andy Hassler. Dave Roberts comes into the game to pinch run for Jorgensen, and Pat Putnam takes over as the Rangers' regular first baseman for the next month. Aside from a pinch-hit appearance on May 31, Jorgensen does not play again until July 1. After suffering headaches, it is discovered he has a small blood clot inside his head, which apparently caused a seizure and could have resulted in his early demise.
May 31 – Detroit Tigers pitcher Pat Underwood makes his major league debut against his brother, Tom, pitching for the Toronto Blue Jays. Both brothers hold the opposing team scoreless until Tom surrendered a solo home run to Jerry Morales leading off the eighth.

June
June 8 – The Kansas City Royals use their fourth overall pick to draft Dan Marino. In the seventeenth round, they select Stanford's John Elway. Neither player would sign with the Royals, though they would go on to record-breaking careers in the National Football League.
June 12 – The Detroit Tigers hire Sparky Anderson as their new manager.
June 14 – The San Diego Padres trade First baseman Mike Hargrove to the Cleveland Indians in exchange for outfielder Paul Dade.
June 18 – Bob Lemon is fired as manager of the defending World Series champ New York Yankees after a sluggish 34-31 start. Billy Martin, originally slated not to take over until the 1980 season, is brought back early by George Steinbrenner, drawing the ire of Reggie Jackson.
June 24 – In a 5–1 loss to the Rangers, Rickey Henderson debuts for the Oakland Athletics. He singles and doubles; the first of his over 3,000 career hits, and steals the first of his over 1,400 bases.
June 26 – Bobby Murcer returns to the New York Yankees after being acquired in a trade with the Chicago Cubs. In exchange for Murcer, the Cubs acquired minor league pitcher Paul Semall.
June 28 – The San Francisco Giants acquire pitchers Al Holland, Ed Whitson, and Fred Breining from the Pittsburgh Pirates in exchange for third baseman Bill Madlock, Lenny Randle and pitcher Dave Roberts.

July
July 6 – The Los Angeles Dodgers purchase the contract of pitcher Fernando Valenzuela from Yucatan of the Mexican League. 
July 12 – The Detroit Tigers win the first game of a scheduled doubleheader against the Chicago White Sox, 4–1, on Disco Demolition Night at Chicago's Comiskey Park. Thousands of young fans swarm onto the field between the games, damaging the field and causing mayhem throughout the stadium. The White Sox are forced to forfeit the second game.
July 13 – In a rare event, Nolan Ryan of the California Angels and Steve Renko of the Boston Red Sox take separate no-hitters into the ninth inning before they both lose the no-hit bids. Ryan's no-hit bid against the New York Yankees benefitted from some questionable official scoring; Jim Spencer's drive to center that Angels centerfielder Rick Miller barely got a glove on was ruled an error. In the ninth, Thurman Munson reached on an error by shortstop Jim Anderson. Two batters later, Reggie Jackson singled to center to unquestionably break up the no-hitter. The next batter, Lou Piniella hit a sacrifice fly to score Munson, and break up the shutout. The run was, however, unearned. Ryan's Angels defeat the Yankees, 6–1. Renko's no-hit bid against the Oakland Athletics is broken up by Rickey Henderson with one out. After recording a second out, Renko walks Mitchell Page, and is pulled in favor of Bill Campbell by Red Sox manager Don Zimmer. Campbell strikes out the only batter he faces, Dave Revering to earn the save, however, Renko is denied the shutout as a result. The Red Sox defeat the A's, 2–0. Ryan's feat, however, receives considerably more attention as the game was nationally televised on ABC's Monday Night Baseball and Ryan (while pitching the game) was on the ensuing issue's cover of Sports Illustrated.
July 17 – The National League wins its eighth straight All-Star Game, 7–6, at Seattle. Lee Mazzilli hits a home run to tie the game in the eighth, and walks in the ninth to bring in the winning run. Dave Parker, with two outstanding throws, is named the MVP, and Pete Rose appears in the game playing first base, making him the only player in MLB history to appear in the game at five different positions in the field in his All-Star game career.
July 24 – Boston's Carl Yastrzemski hits his 400th home run off Oakland Athletics pitcher Mike Morgan in the 7th inning of the Red Sox's 7–3 win over the Athletics at Boston's Fenway Park.
July 27 – Bert Blyleven of the Pittsburgh Pirates pitches a 9-1 complete game victory against the Montreal Expos.  However, he also strikes out five times as a hitter in the game, becoming the only pitcher in major league history to do so.

August
August 2 – The Chicago White Sox announce that Don Kessinger has been fired as manager, and that he will be replaced by rookie manager Tony La Russa.
August 3 – Over 51,000 mourners attend a memorial service for New York Yankees captain Thurman Munson at Yankee Stadium, who was killed the day before in a plane crash.
August 5 – Fred Lynn hits his 100th career home run, helping the Red Sox beat Milwaukee Brewers 7–2.
August 6 – The entire New York Yankee team flies to Canton, Ohio for captain Thurman Munson's funeral. Hours later, the team returns to New York City and defeats the Baltimore Orioles 5–4 at Yankee Stadium, before a national viewing audience on ABC's Monday Night Baseball. Bobby Murcer, one of Munson's best friends, drives in all five Yankee runs with a three-run home run in the seventh inning and a two-run single in the bottom of the ninth.
August 13 – The St. Louis Cardinals' Lou Brock slashes his 3,000th hit off the hand of Chicago Cubs pitcher Dennis Lamp in a 3–2 Cardinals win at Busch Memorial Stadium.
August 22 – At Riverfront Stadium, Johnny Bench breaks Frank Robinson's record for most home runs by a Cincinnati Red. His shot, the 325th home run of his career (all with the Reds), comes off Stan Bahnsen in the fourth inning of the Reds' 7-2 victory over the Montreal Expos.
August 24 – The Philadelphia Phillies retire eventual Hall of Famer Richie Ashburn's number 1.

September
September 4 – Richard Dotson makes his MLB debut for the Chicago White Sox. He lasts only 1.1 innings, giving up five runs and finished with a 33.75 E.R.A. The White Sox rebounded to win 11-7, and Dotson rebounded to pitch 11 years in the majors. 
September 8 – Kirk Gibson makes his major league debut for the Detroit Tigers, striking out pinch hitting for Dave Stegman in Detroit's 5-4 loss to the New York Yankees.
September 11 – Dave Concepción and George Foster hit back-to-back home runs in the seventh inning off Houston Astros ace reliever Joe Sambito and the Cincinnati Reds hold off the Astros 9-8.  The Reds trailed the Astros by 1/2 game and moved into first place to stay in the National League West.  
 Tim Raines makes his major league debut. He is inserted into the game as a pinch runner for catcher Gary Carter in the Montreal Expos 8-6 win over the Chicago Cubs. 
September 12 – The Boston Red Sox's Carl Yastrzemski records his 3,000th career hit with a single off of pitcher Jim Beattie during a 9–2 win over the rival New York Yankees at Fenway Park. He is the first American League player to reach both 3,000 hits and 400 home runs.
September 14 – The Minnesota Twins trade All-Star first baseman Rod Carew to the California Angels for Dave Engle, Paul Hartzell and Brad Havens. Carew, who hit .333 for the Twins in 1978 but had vowed never to play again for team's owner Calvin Griffith after he made disparaging remarks against black players a few months earlier, will hit .318 for the Angels for the rest of the season. Carew will be inducted into the Hall of Fame in 1991.
September 15 – As part of a 10–2 win over the Baltimore Orioles, the Red Sox's Bob Watson hits for the cycle. Having done it for the Houston Astros on June 24, 1977, he is the first player to do this in both leagues.
September 17 – George Brett hits his 20th triple of the season. He is the first player since Willie Mays in 1957 to join the 20–20–20 club.
September 23 – Lou Brock steals the 938th and final base of his career, breaking Billy Hamilton's all-time National League record. Brock's St. Louis Cardinals defeat the New York Mets 7–4 in ten innings.
September 24 – Pete Rose collects his 200th hit of the season, giving him ten seasons with at least 200 hits. This breaks the record set by Ty Cobb.
September 28 – Garry Templeton of the St. Louis Cardinals collects his 100th hit of the season while batting right-handed. Having already collected 100 hits while batting left-handed, Templeton is the first player in history to accomplish this. He had batted right-handed, exclusively, for the last week of the season to get the needed hits.
September 28 – The Cincinnati Reds' Frank Pastore pitches a complete-game 3-0 shutout over the Atlanta Braves, clinching the National League West Division title for the Reds.

October
October 3 – The San Diego Padres release pitcher Mickey Lolich.
October 17 – In Game Seven of the World Series, Willie Stargell hits his third home run of the Series to send the Pittsburgh Pirates to their third straight win over the Baltimore Orioles, to win the World Series Championship. Stargell wins Series MVP honors. The Pirates came back from a deficit of 3 games-to-1.
 Although his team lost in that series, Earl Weaver was named Sporting News Manager of the Year.
 The Chicago Cubs trade pitcher Donnie Moore to the St. Louis Cardinals for second baseman Mike Tyson.
October 23 – Yankee manager Billy Martin gets into a barroom fight with Joseph Cooper, a marshmallow salesman from Minnesota.  Six days later, Martin is fired from the Yankees and replaced with Dick Howser.

November
November 13 – For the first time ever, there will be League co-MVPs as Keith Hernandez of the St. Louis Cardinals shares the National League Baseball Most Valuable Player Award with Willie Stargell of the Pittsburgh Pirates. Stargell is the oldest person to win this award (since broken by Barry Bonds in 2004). The Pirates have thus won (or shared) all four "Most Valuable Player" awards for the season (All-Star Game, National League Championship Series, World Series, and National League regular season). This is the first such sweep in Major League history (Stargell had won the awards for the NLCS, World Series, and National League regular season, while teammate Dave Parker won the All-Star Game award).
November 19 – The Houston Astros sign Nolan Ryan as a free agent. 
November 20 – California Angels outfielder and DH Don Baylor wins the American League Most Valuable Player Award after hitting .296 with 36 home runs and a major league-leading 120 runs scored and 139 runs batted in. Baylor receives 20 of 28 first-place votes to become the first Angel ever to win MVP honors.
November 26 – Third baseman John Castino, who batted .285 for the Minnesota Twins, and shortstop Alfredo Griffin, who hit .287 for the Toronto Blue Jays, tie for the American League Rookie of the Year Award, each receiving seven of the 28 first-place votes. The deadlock precipitates a change in the voting system, effective in 1980.
November 28 – Los Angeles Dodgers pitcher Rick Sutcliffe, who posted a 17–10 record with a 3.46 ERA for a sub-.500 team, receives 20 of first-place 24 votes to earn the National League Rookie of the Year honors. Right fielders Jeffrey Leonard of the Houston Astros (3) and Scot Thompson of the Chicago Cubs (1) receive the other votes.

December
December 1 – San Diego Padres outfielder Dave Winfield and Texas Rangers third baseman Buddy Bell are first-time honorees as The Sporting News announces the 1979 Gold Glove teams.

Movies
Bleacher Bums (TV)
The Kid from Left Field (TV)

Births

January
January 3 – Rosman García
January 3 – Carlos Maldonado
January 3 – Michael Restovich
January 5 – Rubén Quevedo
January 15 – Ben Howard
January 16 – Jack Cust
January 18 – Wandy Rodríguez
January 21 – Byung-hyun Kim
January 22 – Carlos Ruiz
January 23 – Juan Rincón
January 25 – Philip Barzilla
January 26 – Kenny Kelly
January 28 – Phil Seibel
January 29 – Lance Niekro

February
February 7 – Eliézer Alfonzo
February 7 – Humberto Cota
February 7 – Jon Leicester
February 8 – Aaron Cook
February 8 – Ryan Snare
February 9 – Akinori Iwamura
February 9 – Mike Tonis
February 11 – Éric Cyr
February 11 – Chris Mabeus
February 15 – Luis Ugueto
February 17 – Josh Willingham
February 22 – Steve Colyer
February 23 – Chris Aguila
February 24 – Brian Esposito
February 24 – Dennis Tankersley
February 25 – Josh Labandeira

March

March 1 – Chris Barnwell
March 3 – Jorge Julio
March 3 – John Nelson
March 6 – Clint Barmes
March 6 – Érik Bédard
March 9 – Koyie Hill
March 12 – Félix Escalona
March 12 – David Williams
March 13 – Johan Santana
March 14 – José Núñez
March 15 – Kevin Youkilis
March 16 – Hee-seop Choi
March 20 – Shinnosuke Abe
March 20 – Wilfredo Rodríguez
March 21 – Matt Palmer
March 22 – Juan Uribe
March 23 – Mark Buehrle
March 24 – Norris Hopper
March 26 – Jason Dubois
March 27 – Michael Cuddyer
March 30 – Mike Johnston
March 31 – Josh Kinney
March 31 – Charlie Manning

April
April 7 – Adrián Beltré
April 7 – Danny Sandoval
April 8 – Jeremy Guthrie
April 8 – Dane Sardinha
April 12 – Jordan De Jong
April 16 – Justin Huisman
April 16 – Justin Wayne
April 17 – Jorge Piedra
April 19 – Nick Gorneault
April 20 – Sean Green
April 21 – Terry Tiffee
April 23 – Henry Owens
April 23 – Carlos Silva
April 23 – Rich Thompson
April 28 – Sean Douglass

May
May 1 – Brandon Claussen
May 1 – Joe Hietpas
May 4 – Ryan Jorgensen
May 9 – Brandon Webb
May 10 – Tony Álvarez
May 12 – Travis Dawkins
May 18 – Adam Peterson
May 20 – Jayson Werth
May 23 – César Crespo
May 23 – Kirk Saarloos
May 23 – John Webb
May 24 – Joe Kennedy
May 25 – Trey Lunsford
May 25 – Chris Young
May 28 – Ryota Igarashi
May 29 – John Rheinecker

June
June 6 – Jeremy Affeldt
June 6 – Jesús Feliciano
June 8 – Pete Orr
June 9 – Jason Anderson
June 13 – Cory Aldridge
June 13 – Ben Diggins
June 15 – Matt Smith
June 20 – Scott Patterson
June 20 – Cory Vance
June 22 – Brad Hawpe
June 24 – Jason Romano
June 26 – Luis A. González

July
July 4 – Amauri Sanit
July 6 – Vic Carapazza
July 10 – Tyrell Godwin
July 12 – Adam Johnson
July 13 – Kei Igawa
July 14 – Bernie Castro
July 19 – Rick Ankiel
July 24 – Ryan Speier
July 28 – John Coppolella
July 31 – J. J. Furmaniak
July 31 – Andy Van Hekken

August
August 2 – Colby Lewis
August 2 – Humberto Quintero
August 2 – Matt Riley
August 9 – Ron Flores
August 10 – Dan Johnson
August 10 – Brandon Lyon
August 11 – Jorge Padilla
August 12 – D. J. Houlton
August 13 – Román Colón
August 13 – Corey Patterson
August 13 – Jon Switzer
August 14 – Ángel Santos
August 15 – Ryan Budde
August 15 – Roberto Novoa
August 19 – Rocky Cherry
August 20 – Franklyn Gracesqui
August 20 – Cory Sullivan
August 23 – Prentice Redman
August 23 – Chris Roberson
August 26 – Charlie Zink
August 27 – Tommy Murphy
August 27 – Andy Pratt
August 29 – David Sanders
August 29 – Ryan Shealy
August 29 – Eduardo Villacis
August 30 – Scott Richmond
August 30 – Luis Rivas
August 31 – Clay Hensley
August 31 – Shane Loux
August 31 – Tim Raines Jr.
August 31 – Ramón Santiago

September
September 5 – Cliff Bartosh
September 5 – Ryan Spilborghs
September 7 – Nathan Haynes
September 7 – Brian Stokes
September 11 – Frank Francisco
September 16 – Chris George
September 16 – Bobby Korecky
September 18 – Kevin Thompson
September 18 – Billy Traber
September 19 – Lenny DiNardo
September 19 – Andrew Good
September 22 – Charlton Jimerson
September 24 – Nate Cornejo
September 26 – Yurendell DeCaster
September 27 – Jon Garland
September 28 – Jason Young
September 29 – Shelley Duncan
September 29 – Joe Thurston

October
October 9 – Alay Soler
October 10 – Brad Ziegler
October 11 – Shane Youman
October 14 – Duaner Sánchez
October 17 – John Ennis
October 17 – Gil Velazquez
October 20 – Choo Freeman
October 21 – Khalil Greene
October 21 – Gabe Gross
October 21 – Steve Holm
October 21 – Tim Spooneybarger
October 22 – Eli Whiteside
October 23 – Ramón Castro
October 23 – Bud Smith
October 25 – Jeremy Brown
October 25 – Tony Torcato
October 28 – Bobby Cramer
October 30 – Jason Bartlett

November
November 1 – Coco Crisp
November 4 – Ezequiel Astacio
November 6 – Adam LaRoche
November 7 – Willie Collazo
November 9 – Dave Bush
November 9 – Adam Dunn
November 11 – J. R. House
November 13 – Gerald Laird
November 15 – John Stephens
November 18 – Steve Bechler
November 19 – John-Ford Griffin
November 19 – Ryan Howard
November 20 – Lino Urdaneta
November 21 – Bárbaro Cañizares
November 24 – Horacio Ramírez
November 25 – Matt Tupman
November 26 – Jeff Fulchino
November 27 – Carlos Mendoza
November 27 – Jonathan Van Every
November 28 – Nook Logan
November 28 – Mike Schultz
November 29 – Francis Beltrán

December
December 2 – José Morban
December 3 – Eric Hull
December 4 – Manny Gonzalez
December 7 – Ryan Theriot
December 9 – Eric Stults
December 12 – Garrett Atkins
December 15 – Kevin Cameron
December 17 – David Kelton
December 19 – Chip Ambres
December 19 – Rafael Soriano
December 20 – David DeJesus
December 24 – Joe Valentine
December 26 – J. C. Boscán
December 28 – Bill Hall

Deaths

January
January 4 – Bobby Murray, 80, third baseman in ten games for 1923 Washington Senators
January 5 – George Washburn, 64, pitcher who spent 16 years in minor leagues, but appeared in only one major-league game, on May 4, 1941, for the New York Yankees
January 6 – Jesse Douglas, 62, infielder who appeared for three Negro American League teams during five seasons between 1940 and 1945
January 9 – Hinkey Haines, 80, professional baseball and football player; outfielder over 12 minor-league campaigns and a single major-league season, appearing in 28 games for 1923 American League champion New York Yankees, then two games in 1923 World Series; in his final MLB contest, in Game 6, scored winning tally as a pinch runner during the Yanks' eighth-inning, Series-deciding rally, helping them win first world title; played halfback in the National Football League between 1925 and 1932
January 9 – Charley Stis, 94, who spent more than six decades in professional baseball as a player, manager, scout and umpire
January 21 – Sam Leslie, 73, line drive-hitting first baseman who played in 822 games over all or part of ten seasons for the New York Giants (1929–1933 and 1936–1938) and Brooklyn Dodgers (1933–1935); batted .304 lifetime with 749 career hits
January 25 – Charlene Barnett, 50, who played second base in the All-American Girls Professional Baseball League from 1949 to 1952 and was a member of three champion teams
January 26 – Nemo Gaines, 81, left-handed pitcher and U.S. Naval Academy graduate who threw 4 innings of shutout relief in four appearances for the Washington Senators in the midsummer of 1921; left baseball to return to active naval service, where he rose to the rank of captain and retired after World War II
January 29 – Andy Harrington, 75, minor league infielder between 1925 and 1942, who made one appearance in the majors, going hitless in one at bat as a pinch hitter for the Detroit Tigers on April 18, 1925

February
February 1 – Milt Byrnes, 62, outfielder in 390 career games for 1943–1945 St. Louis Browns; member of 1944 American League champions, the only St. Louis-based team to conquer the Junior Circuit
February 7 – Warren Giles, 82, Hall of Fame baseball executive; president of the National League from 1951 to 1969; previously, general manager and club president of the Cincinnati Reds between 1937 and 1951; father of longtime executive Bill Giles
February 8 – Alex Gaston, 85, catcher for the New York Giants (1920–1923) and Boston Red Sox (1926 and 1929) who got into 215 major-league games; brother of pitcher Milt Gaston, whose no-hitter Alex broke up with a seventh-inning single on September 12, 1926
February 8 – Art Williams, 44, the first black umpire in the National League, working from 1972 to 1977 including the 1975 NLCS
February 12 – Ernest Duff, 79, outfielder who batted .341 lifetime for five Negro National League teams between 1925 and 1928
February 12 – Bill Vargus, 79, southpaw hurler for 1925–1926 Boston Braves, appearing in 15 games
February 26 – Forrest Thompson, 60, left-handed pitcher who worked in 55 career games for the Washington Senators (1948–1949)

March
March 2 – Dale Alexander, 75, first baseman who batted .331 in five seasons with the Tigers and Red Sox, winning the 1932 batting title, before an injury ended his career; later a longtime scout
March 6 – Link Wasem, 68, catcher for appeared in two games for the Boston Bees in May 1937
March 12 – Vernon Riddick, 62, infielder for the 1939 and 1941 Newark Eagles of the Negro National League
March 13 – Bill Steen, 91, pitcher who appeared in 108 games for the Cleveland Naps/Indians and Detroit Tigers from 1912 to 1915
March 18 – Percy Jones, 79, left-handed pitcher who appeared in 251 games for the Chicago Cubs (1920–1922, 1925–1928), Boston Braves (1929) and Pittsburgh Pirates (1930)
March 19 – Jack Matchett, 71, member of the Kansas City Monarchs' "Big Four" starting rotation between 1940 and 1945; led 1940 Negro American League pitchers in games won (six)
March 23 – Don Osborn, 70, longtime minor league pitcher and manager who served three terms as pitching coach of the Pittsburgh Pirates between 1963 and 1976; member of 1971 World Series champions
March 23 – Wilson Redus, 74, All-Star outfielder who played in the Negro leagues between 1924 and 1940, principally for the St. Louis Stars and Chicago American Giants
March 26 – Louis Dula, 67, pitcher/outfielder for the Homestead Grays of the Negro National League between 1933 and 1938; went 12–9 (3.62 ERA) in 37 games pitched and batted .314 with 32 hits at the plate
March 29 – Luke Easter, 63, first baseman in the Negro leagues, then with Cleveland Indians (1949–1954); slugged 86 home runs with 307 RBI over his first three full American League seasons (1950–1952); spent one season, 1969, as Cleveland's hitting coach
March 31 – Bob Schultz, 55, left-handed pitcher who worked in 65 games over four big-league campaigns with the Chicago Cubs (1951–1953), Pittsburgh Pirates (1953) and Detroit Tigers (1955)

April
April 3 – Harry Simpson, 53, outfielder and first baseman who led the AL in triples twice during his eight-year career with five clubs between 1951 and 1959
April 6 – Al Evans, 62, catcher in 704 games in a dozen MLB seasons, 11 of them for the Washington Senators (1939–1942 and 1944–1950); later a minor league manager
April 6 – Rudy Kallio, 86, pitcher who hurled in 49 contests for the Detroit Tigers (1918–19) and Boston Red Sox (1925); later a coach for Triple-A Portland Beavers and scout for the Chicago Cubs
April 11 – Eddie Wilson, 69, outfielder who was hitting .347 in 52 games as a rookie for 1936 Brooklyn Dodgers when his skull was fractured by a beanball, August 26; returned to Dodgers in 1937 but only played in 36 more games, and spent the rest of his 13-year career in the minors, retiring in 1941 
April 12 – Sam Edmonston, 95, Washington Senators pitcher who logged three innings in his only big-league game, on June 24, 1907 against Philadelphia; at his death, the oldest living former MLB player
April 13 – Frankie Kelleher, 62, outfielder in 47 games for 1942–1943 Cincinnati Reds; became mainstay of the minor-league Hollywood Stars, playing ten seasons for them (1944 and 1946–1954) and earning a spot in the Pacific Coast League Hall of Fame
April 18 – Lindsay Deal, 67, pinch hitter and outfielder who made it into four games for the 1939 Brooklyn Dodgers
April 21 – Cliff Bolton, 72, lefty-swinging catcher and pinch hitter for the Washington Senators (1931, 1933–1936 and 1941) and Detroit Tigers (1937); batted .410 in a part-time role for 1933 American League champions (.429 as a pinch hitter) and .291 lifetime with 280 hits in 335 career MLB games
April 24 – Fred Koster, 73, outfielder and pinch hitter who played in 76 games for the 1931 Philadelphia Phillies
April 27 – Jim Mooney, 72, left-handed hurler who worked in 92 games for the New York Giants and St. Louis Cardinals from 1931 to 1934; member of 1934 World Series champion "Gashouse Gang" Cardinals; longtime college baseball coach
April 29 – John Allyn, 61, Chicago business executive involved in ownership of the White Sox from 1961 until his death; co-owner (with his brother Arthur Jr.) from 1961–1969, owner and club president from 1969–1975, and minority owner and member of Bill Veeck's syndicate since 1975
April 30 – Wally Kopf, 79, third baseman and second baseman who appeared in two career games for 1921 New York Giants; brother of Larry Kopf

May
May 3 – Tom Jenkins, 81, outfielder who appeared in 171 total games for the Boston Red Sox, Philadelphia Athletics and St. Louis Browns over six seasons between 1925 and 1932
May 5 – Virgil Cheeves, 78, pitcher who worked in 111 MLB games for 1920–1923 Chicago Cubs, 1924 Cleveland Indians and 1927 New York Giants
May 5 – Bill Lucas, 43, general manager of the Atlanta Braves since September 1976 and the first African-American general manager in MLB history; previously, a player and executive in the Braves' organization since 1957
May 6 – Al "Ace" Elliott, 81, first baseman in 63 total games for 1923–1924 Chicago Cubs
May 6 – Red Hale, 65, shortstop for the 1937 Detroit Stars and 1939 Chicago American Giants of the Negro American League
May 6 – Charlie Ripple, 56, left-handed pitcher who worked in 11 games in three brief stints with the 1944–1946 Philadelphia Phillies
May 6 – Bunny Roser, 77, outfielder in 32 games for the 1922 Boston Braves
May 7 – Johnny Berger, 77, catcher who appeared in 11 MLB games for the 1922 Philadelphia Athletics and 1927 Washington Senators
May 7 – Marty McHale, 92, pitcher for the Boston Red Sox, New York Yankees and Cleveland Indians between 1910 and 1916, working in 64 career games; appeared on the vaudeville stage during off-seasons
May 9 – Charlie Hargreaves, 82, catcher in 423 games for the Brooklyn Robins and Pittsburgh Pirates between 1923 and 1930
May 12 – Clyde Kluttz, 61, catcher, scout and executive; appeared in 656 MLB games for six clubs (1942–1948 and 1951–1952); scouted for Kansas City Athletics (signing teenaged pitcher Catfish Hunter) and New York Yankees; then, during his term as Yankees' director of scouting/player development, he helped recruit free agent Hunter to the Bombers after the 1974 season; moved to Baltimore Orioles as vice president/player development, serving from 1976 until his death
May 18 – Ray Blades, 82, left fielder, manager, coach and scout; batted .301 in 767 career games for the St. Louis Cardinals between 1922 and 1932; played on four NL pennant-winners and 1926 and 1931 World Series champions; managed Redbirds from 1939 to June 6, 1940; coached for Cardinals, Cincinnati Reds, Brooklyn Dodgers and Chicago Cubs for a dozen seasons between 1930 and 1956
May 23 – Bob Chesnes, 58, pitcher in 61 games for 1948–1950 Pittsburgh Pirates; his sparkling 14–6 rookie campaign helped lead 1948 Bucs to a surprising first-division finish
May 23 – Hiroshi Oshita, 56, Hall of Fame first baseman who played for the Toei Flyers from 1946 to 1951 and the Nishitetsu Lions from 1952 to 1959
May 29 – Sig Jakucki, 69, hot-tempered pitcher for St. Louis Browns (1936 and 1944–1945) who hurled a complete-game victory on October 1, 1944, to seal the only American League pennant the St. Louis entry ever won; lost his only decision in 1944 World Series; known for alcoholism and brawling, he was kicked off the 1945 Browns on September 1 and never returned to the major leagues
May 30 – Joe Smaza, 55, outfielder who played two games for the Chicago White Sox in September 1946

June
June 8 – Muriel Coben, 58, All-American Girls Professional Baseball League pitcher, and member of a Canadian women's curling champion team
June 11 – Fred Martin, 63, pitcher for the St. Louis Cardinals (1946, 1949–1950) who appeared in 57 career games, his MLB career interrupted by his suspension for "jumping" to the Mexican League in May 1946; later a minor league manager and pitching instructor for the Chicago Cubs, where he taught the split-finger fastball to eventual Hall of Famer Bruce Sutter; was pitching coach of the Chicago White Sox at the time of his passing
June 12 – Bill Brenzel, 69, catcher who appeared in nine games for 1932 Pittsburgh Pirates and 67 contests for 1934–1935 Cleveland Indians; later, a scout for the St. Louis Cardinals from 1948 to 1950 and the Brooklyn and Los Angeles Dodgers from 1951 until his death
June 17 – Duffy Lewis, 91, left fielder for the Boston Red Sox from 1910 to 1917 who starred on three champions (1912, 1915, 1916) and mastered Fenway Park's sloping left field; also played for Yankees and Senators between 1919 and 1921; longtime traveling secretary of the Boston/Milwaukee Braves
June 18 – Hal Trosky, 66, slugging first baseman for the Cleveland Indians between 1933 and 1941 whose career was shortened by persistent migraine headaches; led American League in runs batted in 1936 with 162; batted .302 lifetime with 228 home runs and six 100-RBI seasons; his son briefly pitched in majors
June 27 – Pat Maloney, 91, outfielder who played in 25 games for 1912 New York Highlanders
June 29 – Johnny Bassler, 84, good-hitting catcher who appeared in 44 games for the 1913–1914 Cleveland Naps and 767 contests for the 1921–1927 Detroit Tigers, batting .304 lifetime in 2,319 at bats; coached with Cleveland and the St. Louis Browns between 1938 and 1941; also batted .318 with 1,379 hits in 1,567 minor-league games
June 29 – Steamboat Williams, 87, pitcher who worked in 36 career games for 1914 and 1916 St. Louis Cardinals

July
July 2 – Ed Stauffer, 81, pitcher in 21 total games for 1923 Chicago Cubs and 1925 St. Louis Browns
July 12 – Tom Lovelace, 81, pinch hit in one game with the Pittsburgh Pirates in 1922
July 15 – Garrell Hartman, 66, outfielder for the 1944 Philadelphia Stars of the Negro National League
July 15 – John Holland, 69, longtime baseball executive; general manager of the Chicago Cubs from 1957 through 1975
July 22 – Amos Strunk, 90, center fielder for the Philadelphia Athletics, Boston Red Sox and Chicago White Sox between 1908 and 1924; appeared in 1,512 games and was a member of four World Series champion teams (1910, 1911, 1913, 1918)
July 23 – Lefty West, 63, pitcher who appeared in 35 games for 1944–1945 St. Louis Browns
July 26 – Bill DeKoning, 60, catcher who played in three games (and was hitless in his lone at bat) for 1945 New York Giants

August
August 2 – Thurman Munson, 32, seven-time All-Star catcher for the New York Yankees since September 1969, in the crash of his private plane; 1970 AL Rookie of the Year, 1976 Most Valuable Player, and three-time Gold Glove winner; batted .300 five times (.292 overall in 1,423 regular-season games), and .357 in 30 postseason games; two-time (1977 and 1978) World Series champion whose #15 uniform was retired upon his death
August 7 – Hal Wagner, 64, catcher who played 672 career games for Philadelphia Athletics (1937–1944), Boston Red Sox (1944–1947), Detroit Tigers (1947–1948) and Philadelphia Phillies (1948–1949); two-time American League All-Star
August 9 – Walter O'Malley, 75, principal owner (1950–1975), then sole owner (1975 until his death), of the Dodgers who moved the team from Brooklyn to Los Angeles (1958) and constructed Dodger Stadium (opened 1962); a lawyer, he first invested in the team during World War II (1944–1945), then became one of four equal partners (1945–1950); during his tenure, the Dodgers won four World Series titles (1955, 1959, 1963, 1965) and led MLB in attendance 13 times between 1959 and 1978; although vilified in his native New York City, perhaps the most powerful owner of his time, and was named to the Baseball Hall of Fame in 2008, a half-century after moving his club to Los Angeles
August 14 – Mack Wheat, 86, weak-hitting backup catcher for Brooklyn Robins (1915–1919) and Philadelphia Phillies (1920–1921), playing in 225 total games; brother of Hall of Famer Zach Wheat
August 17 – Bill Grieve, 83, American League umpire from 1938 to 1955; worked in three World Series and two All-Star games
August 26 – Dizzy Sutherland, 57, left-handed hurler given a one-game audition with Washington Senators, September 20, 1949; starting against St. Louis, he walked six of the 11 batters he faced and surrendered five earned runs in one full inning pitched, to be tagged with Washington's 15–6 defeat
August 28 – Paul Hardy, 68, catcher who played for multiple Negro leagues teams during the 1930s and 1940s, including the Kansas City Monarchs

September
September 1 – Buck Ewing, 76, standout catcher of the 1920s and 1930s for Negro leagues and black barnstorming teams, most notably the Homestead Grays
September 4 – Turkey Stearnes, 78, center fielder in the Negro leagues who led the Negro National League in home runs six times while batting .350
September 7 – Percy Wilson, 80, first baseman for the Negro leagues' Milwaukee Bears and Baltimore Black Sox in 1923–1924
September 8 – Rick Joseph, 40, third baseman and first baseman who appeared in 270 career games for the 1964 Kansas City Athletics and 1967–1970 Philadelphia Phillies
September 16 – Charlie Deal, 87, third baseman who played 851 games for five MLB teams (including his Federal League service); started all four games of the 1914 World Series for the "Miracle" world-champion Boston Braves who was the last surviving member of that team; also the starter in the "hot corner" for the 1918 NL champion Chicago Cubs
September 18 – Gene Kelly, 60, sportscaster; Philadelphia Phillies' play-by-play announcer from 1950 to 1959, later working with Waite Hoyt on Cincinnati Reds' crew in 1962 and 1963
September 18 – Isaac Lane, 90, third baseman and Wilberforce University graduate who played for the Dayton Marcos, Columbus Buckeyes and Detroit Stars of the Negro National League from 1920 to 1922
September 22 – Chuffie Alexander, 87, outfielder/infielder in black baseball between 1925 and 1932, including two years of service with the 1927–1928 Birmingham Black Barons of the Negro National League

October
October 4 – Fred Graf, 90, third baseman who had a 16-year career in the minor leagues, interrupted by a four-game trial with the 1913 St. Louis Browns
October 11 – Abe Bowman, 86, pitcher who worked in 24 games for the Cleveland Naps/Indians in 1914 and 1915
October 20 – Cy Slapnicka, 93, pitcher, scout and executive who spent 60 years in baseball; appeared in only ten total MLB games for 1911 Chicago Cubs and 1918 Pittsburgh Pirates, but became one of the most celebrated scouts of his day working for the Cleveland Indians; signed Hall of Famers Lou Boudreau, fellow Iowan Bob Feller and Bob Lemon among many other stars; general manager of the Indians from 1935 to 1940
October 22 – John Drebinger, 88, sportswriter for The New York Times for 41 years
October 25 – Morrie Schick, 87, outfielder and pinch hitter who got into 14 games for 1917 Chicago Cubs
October 29 – Mel Ingram, 75, whose entire pro baseball career consisted of three major-league games as a pinch runner for 1929 Pittsburgh Pirates; he scored one run
October – Anthony Cooper, 75, shortstop/outfielder who played for ten Negro leagues teams over ten seasons spanning 1928 to 1941

November
November 4 – Johnny Priest, 88, infielder who played ten total games in stints for the 1911–1912 New York Highlanders
November 4 – Lancelot "Yank" Terry, 68, pitcher who—despite his nickname—spent his entire MLB career with Boston Red Sox, appearing in 93 games over five seasons (1940 and 1942–1945)
November 15 – Ken Ash, 78, pitcher who appeared in two games for the 1925 Chicago White Sox and 53 contests for the 1928–1930 Cincinnati Reds
November 15 – Ed Klieman, 61, pitcher who worked in 222 games for the Cleveland Indians, Washington Senators, White Sox and Philadelphia Athletics between 1943 and 1950; led AL in saves (17) in 1947
November 16 – Jack Butterfield, 50, vice president/player development and scouting of the New York Yankees and former head baseball coach of the University of Maine (1957–1974) and the University of South Florida (1975–1976); father of Brian Butterfield
November 16 – Joseph Iglehart, 88, investment banker, CBS stockholder and board member, and baseball club owner; joined Baltimore Orioles' ownership group in autumn of 1953, when the team moved from St. Louis; became largest shareholder and served as board chairman from 1955 to 1964; sold his Orioles' stock to Jerold Hoffberger when CBS purchased the Yankees in 1964, then joined Yanks' board of directors, serving until CBS sold the Bombers to George Steinbrenner's syndicate in 1973; continued as limited partner in Steinbrenner's group until selling his interest in 1977
November 18 – Freddie Fitzsimmons, 78, knuckleball pitcher who won 217 games for the New York Giants and Brooklyn Dodgers; manager of Philadelphia Phillies from July 28, 1943 to June 29, 1945; later, a longtime coach associated with manager Leo Durocher
November 25 – Elbert Andrews, 77, relief pitcher who took part in six games for the 1925 Philadelphia Athletics
November 28 – Herb Bremer, 66, second-string catcher who appeared in 70 games for the St. Louis Cardinals between 1937 and 1939
November – Cliff Carter, 79, pitcher who appeared in the Negro leagues for six teams between 1923 and 1934; led 1927 Eastern Colored League in complete games (18)

December
December 2 – Sam Dailey, 75, who posted a 2–2 (7.54 ERA) record in 20 games for the 1929 Philadelphia Phillies in his lone MLB season
December 4 – Bert Delmas, 68, infielder who played 12 games for the 1933 Brooklyn Dodgers
December 4 – Pedro Dibut, 87, pitcher who played with the Cuban Stars West of the Negro National League in 1923 and the Cincinnati Reds of the National League in 1924–1925, appearing in 26 total contests
December 8 – Del Young, 67, shortstop and second baseman who appeared in 309 games for the 1937–1940 Philadelphia Phillies
December 12 – Nick Dumovich, 77, left-hander who pitched in 28 games for 1923 Chicago Cubs
December 14 – Willie Nixon, 63, outfielder for the Birmingham Black Barons, Newark Eagles and Jacksonville Red Caps of the Negro leagues in 1940 and 1941
December 14 – Vinnie Smith, 64, MLB catcher and umpire; appeared in 16 total games for Pittsburgh Pirates (1941 and 1946), then umpired in the National League from 1957 through 1965; officiated for the two All-Star Games played in 1960, and the 1964 World Series
December 15 – Stan Hack, 70, five-time All-Star third baseman for the Chicago Cubs who batted .301 lifetime and posted a .394 career on-base percentage, the highest of any 20th-century third baseman; scored 100 runs seven times and led NL in hits and steals twice each; as Cubs' manager (1954–1956) and interim skipper of St. Louis Cardinals (September 17 through end of 1958 season), compiled a 199–272 record
December 19 – Bud Sketchley, 60, Canadian-born outfielder and pinch hitter who played 13 games for the 1942 Cleveland Indians
December 28 – Hank Butcher, 93, who appeared in 64 games as an outfielder and pinch hitter for the 1911–1912 Cleveland Naps
December 28 – Jim Mosolf, 74, pinch hitter and backup outfielder who played in 118 games for the 1929–1931 Pittsburgh Pirates and 1933 Chicago Cubs
December 29 – Ed Albrecht, 50, pitcher and minor-league phenom who appeared in three total games for 1949–1950 St. Louis Browns; won 29 games (losing 12) with 389 strikeouts in 1949 for Pine Bluff of the Class C Cotton States League; called up by Browns in September, he threw a five-inning, one-hit victory against the White Sox on October 2 for his only MLB triumph (the game, although "official" because it lasted five full innings, was halted because of darkness and a Sunday curfew)
December – Obie Lackey, 76, infielder who played in the Negro leagues and former black barnstorming teams between 1929 and 1945